Cristina Rodriguez Galán (born November 28, 1956 in Andorra la Vella) is an Andorran diplomat who was their ambassador to France and Permanent Delegate to UNESCO from June 24, 2015 until 2019.  She was also Minister of Health, Welfare and Labour of Andorra.

References

1956 births
Andorran women ambassadors
People from Andorra la Vella
Ambassadors of Andorra to France
Permanent Delegates of Andorra to UNESCO
Living people